"Guilty" is a song by the American punk rock band All, written by drummer Bill Stevenson and released as the second single from the band's 1993 album Breaking Things. The single also includes two more songs recorded during the Breaking Things session that were left off the album: "All's Fair", written by Stevenson, and "Man's World", written by Stevenson, singer Chad Price, and bassist Karl Alvarez.

Background 
All three songs on the single were recorded during the Breaking Things sessions in March and April 1993 at Ardent Studios in Memphis, Tennessee, with the record producer and recording engineer John Hampton. Stevenson and guitarist Stephen Egerton also produced the recordings, and Skidd Mills and Jeffrey Reed worked as assistant engineers. Milo Aukerman, of All's precursor band the Descendents, sang backing vocals on the tracks. The recordings were mastered by John Golden at K-Disc in Hollywood, and the "Guilty" single was released through Cruz Records as a 10-inch single and CD single.

"Guilty" was used in the soundtrack to the 1995 film Mallrats, and was included on the accompanying soundtrack album.

Track listing

Personnel 
Band
Karl Alvarez – bass guitar
Stephen Egerton – guitar, producer
Chad Price – vocals
Bill Stevenson – drums, producer

Additional performers
Milo Aukerman – backing vocals

Production
John Golden – mastering
John Hampton – producer, recording engineer
Skidd Mills – assistant engineer
Jeffery Reed – assistant engineer

References

1994 singles
All (band) songs
1993 songs
Songs written by Bill Stevenson (musician)